Saint-Quentin Aerodrome, formerly , was located  northwest of Saint-Quentin, New Brunswick, Canada.

References

Defunct airports in New Brunswick
Buildings and structures in Restigouche County, New Brunswick
Transport in Restigouche County, New Brunswick